Corinthian F.C. and similar can mean:
Corinthian F.C., in London from 1882 to 1939
Sport Club Corinthians Paulista, in São Paulo, Brazil
Corinthians F.C. (Isle of Man)
Corinthian F.C. (Kent)
Corinthians F.C. (Johannesburg)

See also 
Corinthian-Casuals F.C. – an amateur club from London, successor to Corinthian F.C.
Cardiff Corinthians F.C.
Galway Corinthians RFC
Corinthian (disambiguation)

nl:Corinthians FC